I Want My Money Back is the eighth studio album by American country music artist Sammy Kershaw, released on March 25, 2003. His first album for Audium/Koch Entertainment, it produced two singles on the Billboard country charts: the title track at #33 and "I've Never Been Anywhere" at #58.

Two songs on this album were recorded by two other artists each. "Beer, Bait and Ammo" was  originally recorded by Kevin Fowler on his 2000 album of the same name, and later by Mark Chesnutt on his 2005 album Savin' the Honky Tonk. "Metropolis" was later recorded by Anthony Smith on his 2003 album If That Ain't Country, and by Trace Adkins on his 2005 album Songs About Me.

Stephen Thomas Erlewine of Allmusic called it "one of his most satisfying efforts."

Track listing

Personnel
As listed in liner notes.
Glen Duncan - fiddle
Paul Franklin - steel guitar
Sammy Kershaw - lead vocals
Richard Landis - electric piano, percussion
Paul Leim - drums
B. James Lowry - acoustic guitar
Brent Mason - electric guitar
Jimmy Nichols - synthesizer, background vocals
Dave Pomeroy - bass guitar
Matt Rollings - piano
John Wesley Ryles - background vocals
Russell Terrell - background vocals
Dennis Wilson - background vocals
Curtis Young - background vocals

Chart performance

References

2003 albums
Sammy Kershaw albums
E1 Music albums
Albums produced by Richard Landis